Rasputin is a 2003 Finnish-language opera in three acts by Einojuhani Rautavaara.

Recordings
DVD Matti Salminen (Grigory Yefimovich Rasputin), Lilli Paasikivi (Alexandra Fyodorovna), Jorma Hynninen (Tsar Nicholas), Riikka Rantanen (Irina Yusupova), Ritva-Liisa Korhonen (Anya Vyrubova), Jyrki Anttila (Felix Yusupov), Gabriel Suovanen (Dimitri Pavlovich), Jyrki Korhonen (Vladimir Purishkevich), Finnish National Opera Orchestra and Chorus, Mikko Franck Ondine 2006

References

Operas
2003 operas
Finnish-language operas
Operas by Einojuhani Rautavaara